Joaquín Blanco Roca (born 22 November 1957) is a Spanish Olympic sailor in the Finn class. He competed in the 1984 Summer Olympics, where he finished 4th in Finn.

He is the father of Olympic sailor Joaquín Blanco Albalat.

Career
Blanco, born 1957 in Las Palmas de Gran Canaria, sailed in the Finn class. He won the 1977 Finn Gold Cup competition, but was not awarded the trophy because the International Finn Association withdrew the championship status when Spain refused to accept entries of two South African sailors, however, in 2017, the International Finn Association acknowledged him as winner of the Finn Gold Cup.

He competed in the 1984 Summer Olympics, where he finished 4th in Finn after Russell Coutts, John Bertrand, and Terry Neilson.

References

External links
 
 
 
 

1957 births
Living people
Spanish male sailors (sport)
Olympic sailors of Spain
Sailors at the 1984 Summer Olympics – Finn
Mediterranean Games gold medalists for Spain